Lieutenant-General Charles Griffiths (3 August 1763 – 31 May 1829) was a British soldier, foster brother to Prince Frederick, Duke of York and Albany, Lieutenant-General and Captain of Yarmouth Castle, Isle of Wight.

Parents and marriage
Griffiths was the son of the Reverend John Griffiths and his wife Mary, the daughter of John Denham. Mary has been described as the foster-mother to the Duke of York, second son of George III. Griffiths was thirteen days older than the Duke of York and has been described in turn as the latter's foster-brother. He married on 7 June 1796 Caroline Francis, the daughter of Sir William Neville Hart and Elizabeth, the daughter of Stanhope Aspinwall. His elder brother, John Griffiths of Erryd, was a medical practitioner and surgeon to Queen Charlotte's Household 1792–1818.   His elder brother's wife, Elizabeth, was the sister of his own wife.

Military career
In 1779, Griffiths was appointed ensign in the 15th Regiment of Foot. He was placed on half-pay in 1783, restored to full-pay in the 40th Regiment in 1786 and appointed lieutenant in the 76th Regiment of Foot in 1787.

Service in India
During the Third Anglo-Mysore War, Griffiths served in the East Indies (i.e. India). He was present at the siege, assault, and capture of the town and fortress of Bangalore, also at the siege and storming of the hill fort of Savendroog in the general action near Seringapatam with Tippu Sultan on 15 May 1791. He was wounded in the general action on 6 February 1792, when the enemy's lines were stormed under the walls of Seringapatam and at the siege of that capital. It terminated in the peace of 19 March of that same year.

French Revolutionary Wars
Later, in 1794, Griffiths was promoted to a company in the 14th Foot and with them he participated in the French Revolutionary Wars. He served in Flanders with the army under the Duke of York, and was in the actions of 17/18 May, and at the storming of the village of Pontechin on 22 May, with the brigade under Major-General Henry Edward Fox, consisting of the 14th, 37th, and 53rd Regiments. He was in the action of Geldermansel or Geldermalsen, on the Waal, under Lord Cathcart. He was appointed major in the 82nd Regiment in 1796, and served in Ireland and Menorca with that Corps. Griffiths was promoted to lieutenant-colonel in ancient Irish Fencibles on 11 December 1800. He served with that corps in Egypt, and was present at the Siege of Alexandria.

Later career and the Napoleonic Wars
During the Napoleonic Wars, Griffiths was subsequently placed on the staff in Ireland and England, and received the brevet of colonel in 1810. In the following year he was appointed lieutenant-colonel of the 2nd Battalion of the 11th Regiment of Foot, which corps he joined at Gibraltar. He received the rank of major-general on 4 June 1813, and was placed on the staff of the garrison at Gibraltar. In the neighbouring Straits he commanded for nearly two years the British auxiliary troops in the fortress of Ceuta. He attained the rank of lieutenant-general in 1825.

In 1820 he was appointed Captain of Yarmouth Castle on the Isle of Wight, a position he held until his death in 1829.

Notes

References
 Burke’s Landed Gentry; 17th Edition 1952; under Copland-Griffiths of Potterne; NOTE at bottom of 2nd column p. 1082, and page 1083, right hand column -  4. Charles, Lt.-Gen.
 Plantagenet Roll of the Blood Royal: The Isabel of Essex Volume, Containing the Descendants of Isabel (Plantagenet), Countess of Essex & Eu by Ruvigny and Raineval Staff published by Genealogical Publishing Com, 1994; pp. 515 and 516.
 The Gentleman's Magazine and Historical Chronicle : Volume 99, 1829, the 22nd of a new series, 2nd Part, Aug.  p. 180, Obituary.-Lt.-Gen. Charles Griffiths, out of copyright and now in the public domain, edited.

1763 births
1829 deaths
British Army lieutenant generals
British military personnel of the Third Anglo-Mysore War
British Army personnel of the French Revolutionary Wars
British Army personnel of the Napoleonic Wars
East Yorkshire Regiment officers
40th Regiment of Foot officers
76th Regiment of Foot officers
West Yorkshire Regiment officers
Devonshire Regiment officers